Mares is a manufacturer of scuba equipment. Founded in 1949 by Ludovico Mares in Rapallo, Italy, the company initially made diving masks and spearguns. It has since expanded to become one of the largest scuba manufacturers, having merged with US manufacturer Dacor.

Products
The Mares product range includes the following products:
 Diving Regulators - Both first stage and second stage regulators
 Dive computers
 Instruments - compasses, pressure gauges, Personal computer interfaces for their dive computers and watches
 B.C.D.s
 Diving Wear – including Wetsuits, Drysuits and Rash guards
 Fins
 Diving masks and Snorkels
 Accessories - Their accessories line includes dive torches, knives, Surface marker buoys, diving sportswear, bags, weight belts, hangers, dry boxes, etc.

In 2019 Mares entered the rebreather market with the launch of the Horizon.

References

External links 
 Mares official site

Rebreather makers
Diving engineering
Diving equipment manufacturers
Engineering companies of Italy
Italian brands
Watch manufacturing companies of Italy
Companies based in Liguria
Rapallo
Sporting_goods_manufacturers_of_Italy